The 1996 Men's Ice Hockey World Championships was the 60th such event sanctioned by the International Ice Hockey Federation (IIHF). Teams representing 36 countries participated in several levels of competition, with Slovakia making their first appearance in the top Champions Group A, in their fourth tournament since the dissolution of Czechoslovakia and the formation of the separate Czech Republic and Slovakia men's national ice hockey teams. The competition also served as qualifications for group placements in the 1997 competition.

The top Championship Group A tournament took place in Austria from 21 April to 5 May 1996, with all games played in Vienna. Twelve teams took part, with the first round split into two groups of six, with the first four from each group advancing to the quarter-finals. The Czech Republic beat Canada in the final to become World Champions for the first time.  The final game was tied at two apiece before Martin Procházka scored with nineteen seconds left, followed by an empty net goal to seal the victory. In the bronze medal game, Brian Rolston scored at 4:48 of overtime to win the first medal in 34 years for team USA. The unfortunate Russians, competing in their fifth tournament since being created after the dissolution of the Soviet Union, did not lose a game in regulation time in the entire tournament, but finished fourth.

World Championship Group A (Austria)

First round

Group 1

Group 2

Playoff round

Quarterfinals

Consolation round 11–12 place 

Austria was relegated to Group B.

Semifinals

Match for third place

Final

World Championship Group B (Netherlands)
Played 10–20 April in Eindhoven.  Latvia won at this level for the first time.  In their final game, superb goaltending by Artūrs Irbe kept them in it, and a late tying goal by Oļegs Znaroks sealed the tournament victory. The final game had high drama for the host crowd, the Japanese and Danish teams among them.  If the Netherlands were to lose to Poland, they would finish last and be relegated, a tie and Japan would be last, a win and Denmark would be last.  A third period goal by Poland sealed Japan's fate.

Latvia was promoted to Group A while Japan was relegated to Group C.

World Championship Group C (Slovenia)
Played 22–31 March in Jesenice and Kranj.  For the fourth year in row the Kazakhs and Ukrainians met in Group C.  For the first time the Kazakhs came out on top, and it was the difference in winning the tournament.

Kazakhstan was promoted to Group B while Croatia was relegated to Group D.

World Championship Group D (Lithuania) 
Played in Kaunas and Elektrenai 25–31 March.  To narrow the field of the bottom tier to eight nations, two regional qualifying tournaments were used.

Qualifying round

Group 1 (Australia) 
Played 5 and 6 November 1995 in Sydney.

Group 2 (Israel) 
Played 27–29 January 1996 in Metulla.

The Greek team originally won both their games, but it was later found that they had used ineligible players. Both games were declared 5–0 forfeits in favour of the opposing team.

First round

Group 1

Group 2 
The Israeli team, that had qualified for the tournament after the Greek forfeits, had to forfeit its first two games because they used two Russian players who did not have the proper clearance to play.

Final Round 29–32 Place 

Host Lithuania won all five games to earn promotion to Group C.

Consolation round 33–36 place

Ranking and statistics

Tournament awards
Best players selected by the directorate:
Best Goaltender:       Roman Turek
Best Defenceman:       Alexei Zhitnik
Best Forward:          Yanic Perreault
Media All-Star Team:
Goaltender:  Roman Turek
Defence:  Michal Sýkora,  Alexei Zhitnik
Forwards:  Paul Kariya,  Robert Reichel,  Otakar Vejvoda

Final standings
The final standings of the tournament according to IIHF:

Scoring leaders
List shows the top skaters sorted by points, then goals.
Source:

Leading goaltenders
Only the top five goaltenders, based on save percentage, who have played 40% of their team's minutes are included in this list.
Source:

Citations

See also
 1996 World Junior Ice Hockey Championships

References
Complete results

1996
World Championships,Men
World Championships,Men
April 1996 sports events in Europe
May 1996 sports events in Europe
Sports competitions in Vienna
1996,Ice Hockey World Championships,Men
World Championships,Men
World Championships,Men
World Championships,Men
World Championships,Men
World Championships,Men
World Championships,Men
World Championships,Men
March 1996 sports events in Europe
Sports competitions in Kaunas
1996 Ice Hockey World Championships,Men
Sport in Elektrėnai
Sport in Kranj
Sport in Jesenice, Jesenice
Sports competitions in Eindhoven
1996 Ice Hockey World Championships,Men